Penryn and Falmouth was the name of a constituency in Cornwall, England, UK, represented in the House of Commons of the Parliament of the United Kingdom from 1832 until 1950. From 1832 to 1918 it was a parliamentary borough, initially returning two Members of Parliament (MPs), elected by the bloc vote system.

Under the Redistribution of Seats Act 1885, its representation was reduced to one member, elected by the first past the post system. In 1918 the borough was abolished and the name was transferred to a county constituency electing one MP.

Boundaries
1918–1950: The Municipal Boroughs of Falmouth, Penryn, and Truro, the Urban District of St Austell, the Rural District of St Austell except the civil parishes of St Sampson and Tywardreath, the Rural District of East Kerrier except the civil parishes of Constantine, Mabe, and Perranarworthal, and the Rural District of Truro except the civil parishes of Kea, Kenwyn Rural, Perranzabuloe, St Agnes, St Allen, and Tregavethan.

History 
The constituency was created by the Reform Act 1832 (the "Great Reform Act") as a replacement for the Penryn constituency, which had become a notoriously rotten borough. The new borough consisted of Penryn, Falmouth and parts of Budock and St Gluvias parishes, giving it a mostly urban population of nearly 12,000, of whom 875 were registered to vote at its first election in 1832.

Initially Penryn and Falmouth elected two MPs, but this was reduced to one in 1885. It was one of the smallest constituencies in England for the next thirty years. At this period its voters were politically unpredictable; though generally among the more Conservative Cornish constituencies, they were influenced by personal factors and often swung against the national tide of opinion. Falmouth, which had a stronger non-conformist presence, was the more Liberal part of the constituency in the late 19th century, but was thought to become more Conservative as it developed its economy as a destination seaside resort.

In 1918 the borough was abolished, but the Penryn and Falmouth name was applied to the county constituency in which the two towns were placed. This was a much more extensive constituency, covering the whole of south central Cornwall, including the towns of Truro and St Austell as well a long stretch of coastline. The constituency had a more industrial character (a sixth of the population were engaged in tin mining); the area suffered badly from unemployment in the 1930s, and in 1935 the Labour Party came within 3,031 votes of winning what would have been their first seat in Cornwall.

The constituency was abolished for the 1950 general election, most of its area being moved into the Truro constituency. Penryn and Falmouth were assigned to the new Falmouth and Camborne division.

Members of Parliament

Penryn & Falmouth borough 1832–1885

Penryn & Falmouth borough 1885–1918

Penryn & Falmouth division of Cornwall 1918–1950

Elections

Elections in the 1830s

Rolfe was appointed Solicitor General for England and Wales, requiring a by-election.

Elections in the 1840s
Rolfe resigned after being appointed a Judge of the Court of the Exchequer, causing a by-election.

Elections in the 1850s

Baring was appointed a Civil Lord of the Admiralty, requiring a by-election.

Elections in the 1860s

Baring succeeded to the peerage, becoming Lord Northbrook and causing a by-election.

Elections in the 1870s

Elections in the 1880s

Elections in the 1890s

Elections in the 1900s

Elections in the 1910s 

General Election 1914–15:
Another General Election was required to take place before the end of 1915. The political parties had been making preparations for an election to take place and by July 1914, the following candidates had been selected; 
Unionist: Charles Sydney Goldman
Liberal:

Elections in the 1920s

Elections in the 1930s 

A General election was due to take place before the end of 1940, but was postponed due to the Second World War. By 1939, the following candidates had been selected to contest this constituency;
Conservative: Maurice Petherick
Labour: A.L.Rowse

Elections in the 1940s

References

Sources 
 Michael Kinnear, The British Voter (London: BH Batsford, Ltd, 1968)
 Henry Pelling, Social Geography of British Elections 1885-1910 (London: Macmillan, 1967)
 J Holladay Philbin, Parliamentary Representation 1832 - England and Wales (New Haven: Yale University Press, 1965)
 Frederic A Youngs, jr, Guide to the Local Administrative Units of England, Vol I (London: Royal Historical Society, 1979)

Constituencies of the Parliament of the United Kingdom established in 1832
Constituencies of the Parliament of the United Kingdom disestablished in 1950
Parliamentary constituencies in Cornwall (historic)
Falmouth, Cornwall